Lewisham was a borough constituency in the Lewisham district of London.  It returned one Member of Parliament (MP) to the House of Commons of the Parliament of the United Kingdom, elected by the first past the post system.

History
The constituency was created by the Redistribution of Seats Act 1885 for the 1885 general election, and abolished for the 1918 general election. It was replaced by the new Lewisham East and Lewisham West constituencies.

During its existence Lewisham was a safe Conservative seat. In Lewisham, between 1885 and 1906, the electorate more than doubled and over this period the population of poorer people in the constituency grew. Over the six general elections of 1885, 1886, 1892, 1906 and January and December 1910 the average Conservative share of the vote in Lewisham was 63.0%.

Boundaries 
1885–1918: The parishes of Lewisham and Lee.

Members of Parliament

Election results

Elections in the 1880s

Legge was appointed Vice-Chamberlain of the Household, requiring a by-election.

Elections in the 1890s

 Caused by Legge's succession to the peerage, becoming Earl of Dartmouth.

Elections in the 1900s

Elections in the 1910s

Notes

References 

 British Parliamentary Election Results 1885-1918, compiled and edited by F.W.S. Craig (Macmillan Press 1974)
 Debrett’s Illustrated Heraldic and Biographical House of Commons and the Judicial Bench 1886
 Debrett’s House of Commons and the Judicial Bench 1901
 Debrett’s House of Commons and the Judicial Bench 1918

Parliamentary constituencies in London (historic)
Constituencies of the Parliament of the United Kingdom established in 1885
Constituencies of the Parliament of the United Kingdom disestablished in 1918
Politics of the London Borough of Lewisham